Dobrovíz is a municipality and village in Prague-West District in the Central Bohemian Region of the Czech Republic. It has about 600 inhabitants. The village has well preserved folk architecture and is protected by law as a village monument reservation.

Geography
It lies in a flat agricultural landscape of the Prague Plateau.

History

The first written mention of Dobrovíz is from 1238, when the village was donated to the Zderaz Monastery in what is today Prague-New Town. For a short time, there was a fortress, but it was probably destroyed during the Hussite Wars. From 1447 to 1621, Dobrovíz was owned by the Kolowrat family as a part of the Buštěhrad estate. During the Thirty Years' War, the village was badly damaged. In 1645, Dobrovíz was returned to the Christian church, then it was acquired by the Jesuits, who owned it until 1773.

Economy
There is the distribution centre of Amazon in the municipality.

Transport
The D6 motorway passes through the southern part of the municipality.

The Václav Havel Airport Prague is partially located in the municipal territory.

Sights
The historic centre of Dobrovíz is declared a village monument reservation. The set of folk architecture houses consists of brick buildings from the 18th and 19th centuries with stucco façade decoration. The baroque Chapel of the Virgin Mary is located in the centre of Dobrovíz.

References

External links

Villages in Prague-West District